Emanuel Ungaro (13 February 1933 – 21 December 2019) was a French fashion designer who founded the fashion house called the House of Emanuel Ungaro in 1965.

Early life
Ungaro's Italian father fled to France from Francavilla Fontana of Brindisi province because of the fascist dictatorship in Italy. Ungaro's father was a tailor and he gave his son a sewing machine when he was young.

The House of Emanuel Ungaro
At the age of 22, Ungaro moved to Paris. Three years later he began designing for the House of Cristóbal Balenciaga for three years before quitting to work for Courrèges. Four years later, in 1965 with the assistance of Swiss artist Sonja Knapp and Elena Bruna Fassio, Ungaro opened his own fashion house in Paris.

During the mid- to late 1960s, Ungaro was known as one of the Space Age designers, along with Andre Courrèges, Pierre Cardin, Paco Rabanne, Rudi Gernreich, Jean-Marie Armand, and Diana Dew, creating ultra-modern, futuristic clothing of stark simplicity consisting of flaring, mini-length garments of geometric shape in welt-seamed double-faced wools, synthetics, plastics, and metals worn with high boots, helmets, visors, and chrome and plastic jewelry.

His womenswear designs of the 1970s were noted for their exuberant mixing of colorful prints. He experimented with a few silhouettes and styles in the early part of the decade before settling in to the voluminous, layered, peasant-based styles known as the Big Look or Soft Look that dominated high fashion from 1974 to 1978, Ungaro's print mixtures fitting well into the period's multi-layer esthetic. He didn't adopt the big Fall 1978 change to big shoulders and narrow skirts until 1979, but during the 1980s he would reach a pinnacle of success and influence with his versions of it.

Ungaro entered perhaps his most influential period in the 1980s, as he interpreted the era's aggressive, broad-shouldered women's silhouette with Edwardian-style shirring, ruching, draping, and his trademark eye-catching prints to create a voluptuous, very feminine, even coquettish look that was highly popular with the public.

Ungaro launched his first menswear collection, Ungaro Uomo, in 1973, and his first perfume, Diva, 10 years later in 1983. Ungaro was a participant in The Battle of Versailles Fashion Show held on 28 November 1973. Later followed the perfumes Senso (1987), Ungaro (1991) and Emanuel Ungaro For Men (1991). In 1996, he formed a partnership with Salvatore Ferragamo. In 1997, Ungaro, Ferragamo and Bulgari created a new company: Emanuel Ungaro Parfums. The new perfumes to follow were Fleur de Diva (1997), Desnuda (2001) and Apparition (2004).

In the late 1970s, fashion journalist Michael Roberts, when opening a Sunday column in The Times, said  "Emanuel Ungaro has a great charm. He wears it around his neck."

In 2005, Ungaro retired and sold the label to internet entrepreneur Asim Abdullah for US$84 million.

After the sale, the label languished with a revolving door of designers, the last of which, Esteban Cortazar, who was appointed in 2007, was fired two years later after his refusal to work with actress Lindsay Lohan. Subsequently, Lohan was appointed Artistic Director, working with new head designer Estrella Archs, who was hired hastily to replace Cortazar. The introduction of Lohan, which was meant to give the label publicity, was received with shock and dismay in Paris Fashion Week 2009. In 2010, during Paris Fashion Week, Lindsay Lohan announced that she was no longer working for or with Ungaro, and that she could not comment on the matter because of legal issues. Her work was heavily criticized and soon after the fashion house was looking for a buyer.

In 2009, the label had sales of about $200 million from fragrance and less-expensive lines sold in Asia, but the runway collection has been losing money for years. In April 2010, it was announced that Archs had been dismissed and British designer Giles Deacon would be taking over as creative director.

In 2012, the Italian company Aeffe took over the production and distribution of Ungaro products. In September 2012, Fausto Puglisi was named creative director of Ungaro, and the brand announced its comeback to the Paris Fashion Week. In 2015, Ungaro launched a smart ring that, connected to a phone, dimly lights up when a selected few contacts call. In March 2017, Fausto Puglisi was replaced by Marco Colagrossi (formerly women's wear at Giorgio Armani) as creative director of Ungaro.

Fragrance
In 2008, Avon and Emanuel Ungaro collaborated to launch a new duo of fragrances, U by Ungaro for Her and U by Ungaro for Him. Actress Reese Witherspoon served as the scents' spokeswoman.
 Avon U by Ungaro For Her was developed by perfumers Jean Marc Chaillan and Loc Dong, and the "fresh, woody floral" includes notes of bergamot blossom, freesia, pepper blossom, acacia aura, lotus flower, osmanthus, iris, sandalwood and musk.
 Avon U by Ungaro For Him was developed by Yves Cassar and Pascal Gaurin, and the "woody aromatic watery blend" features green mandarin leaf, ruby red grapefruit, pomegranate, immortelle, cardamom, cedar leaf, vetiver, patchouli, sandalwood, tonka bean and Balsam of Peru.

Personal life
In 1988, Ungaro married Laura Bernabei. He has a daughter, Cosima Ungaro, born in Neuilly-sur-Seine, but her birthdate has been kept a secret.

References

Further reading
Morris, Bernadine. "Review/Design:When America Stole The Runway From Paris Couture".The New York Times, 10 Sep 1993.

External links

Official website

1933 births
2019 deaths
French fashion designers
French people of Italian descent
People of Apulian descent
People from Aix-en-Provence
Chevaliers of the Légion d'honneur
French brands